Palimbolus femoralis is a beetle in the Staphylinidae (rove beetle) family, which is found in Australia.

It was first described by Arthur Mills Lea in 1911 from a male specimen collected somewhere in Australia.

Description
Lea describes the species:

References 

Beetles described in 1911
Taxa named by Arthur Mills Lea
Pselaphinae